The prince's wand (also known as a penis plug) is a piece of body piercing jewelry. It consists of a hollow tube with a threaded cap at the end. The tube is inserted into the urethra, and a stem is inserted through a Prince Albert piercing and into another threaded hole on the side of the tube. The general shape is similar to a police nightstick. The little side stem holds the tube in place. The threaded cap, often just a ball, can be removed so the wearer can urinate through the hollow tube without having to remove the jewelry (from the Prince Albert piercing).

Most prince's wands are held in place by a Prince Albert (PA) piercing, but any urethral piercing can be used, and some wands require no piercing.

Prince's wands are somewhat uncommon, expensive to buy and relatively difficult to manufacture or procure. They are most popular among men who enjoy urethral play. Prince's wands require precision measurements of the penis and urethra both flaccid and erect, in addition to the original Prince Albert piercing.

Types of prince's wands

There are three basic types of prince's wands. The most common, or standard type is the basic "policeman's nightstick".  Ringed wands have one or more external rings that are attached to the bead on the outside stem of the wand that passes through the PA piercing, and encircle the penis. Finally, pinless wands do not require a PA piercing to wear, as they have no stem to insert through a piercing. 

Rarer features include more than one stem, e.g. two opposite ones for an ampallang or an apadravya or multiple stems for more than one piercing, and various attachments to the external beads.

References 

Body piercing jewellery